Oleg Kovalyov may refer to:
 Aleh Kavalyow (born 1987), Belarusian footballer
 Oleg Ivanovich Kovalyov (1948–2020), Russian politician, governor of Ryazan Oblast